The men's road race at the 1989 UCI Road World Championships was the 56th edition of the event.

The race was won by Greg LeMond of the United States. By winning the race, LeMond achieved two cycling doubles: This was his second World Championship road race win, following his victory at the 1983 event. He was also the World Championship road race and a Grand Tour winner in the same year, after his success at the 1989 Tour de France.

Final classification

References

Further reading
 

Men's Road Race
UCI Road World Championships – Men's road race
1989 in road cycling